Akbaalia is a Native American mythological figure of the Plains Indians Crow Nation people. It is a healer that can cure a wide range of physical and psychological ailments.

References 

Crow mythology